Bell Lake may refer to:

 Bell Lake, Manitoba, Canada; a lake in Bell Lake Provincial Park
 Bell Lake Provincial Park, Manitoba, Canada
 Bell Lake, Ontario, Canada; any of several lakes, see List of lakes of Ontario: B
 Bell Lake, Halifax Regional Municipality, Nova Scotia, Canada; either of two lakes, see List of lakes of Nova Scotia

See also

 Belle Lake (Nova Scotia), Canada; a lake on Cape Breton
 Belle Lake, Minnesota, USA; a lake
 Lake-Bell House, Washington County, Arkansas, USA; a historic building
 Lake Bell (born 1979), American film director